Killeeshil St Mary's is a Gaelic Athletic Association club based in the village of Killeeshil in County Tyrone, Northern Ireland.

Notable players
 Kevin Hughes - former Tyrone inter-county senior footballer

Achievements
 Tyrone Intermediate Football Championship
 1986
 Tyrone Junior Football Championship (1)
 2013
 Ulster Junior Club Football Championship (runner-up) 2013

References

Gaelic games clubs in County Tyrone
Gaelic football clubs in County Tyrone